The government of José Ramón Bauzá was formed on 20 June 2011, following the latter's election as President of the Balearic Islands by the Parliament of the Balearic Islands on 15 June, as a result of the absolute majority obtained by the People's Party (PP) at the 2011 regional election.

Investiture

Council of Government
The Government of the Balearic Islands was structured into the offices for the president, the vice president, seven ministries and the post of the spokesperson of the Government.  The number of ministries was increased to nine after the economic vice presidency was split into the Economy and Finance departments in May 2013.

Notes

References

Cabinets established in 2011
Cabinets disestablished in 2015
Cabinets of the Balearic Islands